Yasir Salem is an American triathlete, marathon enthusiast, cyclist, and competitive eater. He is currently ranked number 11 in Major League Eating’s list of competitive eaters.

Salem is the Tour de Donut and the Donut Derby champion. He is also the former National Sweet Corn Eating champion and world record-holder (47 ears of corn in 12 minutes), and has competed in the Nathan’s Hot Dog Eating Contest five times.

Salem frequently appears in the media to discuss his competitions and activities in outlets such as Runner's World magazine, Bicycling magazine, Triathlete magazine, Men's Health magazine, Men's Fitness magazine, ESPN, Muscle & Fitness, Women's Health, The Wall Street Journal, Bloomberg, MSNBC, ABC.

Biography 
Salem was born in Houston, Texas. He is of Egyptian, Turkish and Armenian ancestry. He attended Clear Lake High School in Houston, Texas, and went on to earn a Bachelor of Arts in Economics at the University of Texas at Austin, as well as an MBA at Rutgers University in New Brunswick, New Jersey.

Salem’s first Major League Eating win was at the Nathan’s Hot Dog Eating Contest Qualifier in Concord, North Carolina in 2012. His first Major League Eating title came in September 2013, when he ate 31.75 cannoli at Little Italy’s Feast of San Gennaro Cannoli Eating Championship. Salem’s first Tour de Donut championship was the Tour de Donut Ohio in 2014.

Tour de Donut and Donut Derby

Tour de Donut 
Salem has competed in several Tour de Donut road races across America. Each city’s annual bicycle race has cyclists race for 30 miles to earn the lowest times by eating donuts at two pit stops along the track. For each donut consumed, riders’ times are reduced by five minutes. Rather than award the first cyclist to cross the finish line, the champion with the lowest "donut-adjusted time" is named the winner of the race. Salem eats 12 donuts at a time during the races.

Cities and years competed:
 Ohio: 2014, 2015, 2016, 2017
 Utah: 2014, 2015
 Illinois: 2014, 2015, 2016, 2017
 Austin: 2016, 2017

Donut Derby 
Salem competed in Pennsylvania’s Donut Derby bicycle race in 2015, 2016 and 2017, achieving his best "donut style" bicycle race by eating 61 donuts over 36 miles for a donut-adjusted time of -31 minutes.

Competitive eating 
Salem’s entry into the competitive eating scene started as something of a joke. "I was watching the Nathan’s contest in 2008, and I thought, ‘Wow, all I have to do is eat a bunch of hot dogs and I can be on ESPN?’" he told Mental Floss. He trains by eating a 4 to 6 pounds salad every day for lunch followed by a gallon of water. He credits enlisting the help of a hypnotherapist as a key turning point in his success as a competitive eater.

Triathlete, runner, and cyclist 
Salem ran and completed his first marathon in the 2010 New York City Marathon. By June 2017, he had completed 20.

He competed in his first New York City Triathlon in 2012, having only learned to swim that same year. He then competed in his first Ironman in 2013, and would complete four total by 2015.

Salem owns 3 bicycles, and is known to use a Quintana Roo PR6 Ultegra Di2 with Reynolds Strike wheels for triathlons.

He has stated his intent to run one marathon each month in 2017, and is currently training for the 2018 Race Across the West and the 2019 Race Across America ultra-endurance bicycle races, which are 900 and 3,000 miles, respectively.

Championships and world records held

2013 
 Cannoli: 31.75 cannoli / 6 minutes (New York City, New York, September 13, 2013) at Feast of San Gennaro World Cannoli Eating Championship

2014 
 Donut Dash 5K champion: Donut-adjusted time of 3 minutes, 15 seconds / 22 donuts (Dayton, Ohio, June 28, 2014)
 Tour de Donut Ohio ‘Double D’ champion: Donut-adjusted time of -32 minutes, 45 seconds / 48 donuts (Arcanum, Ohio, September 6, 2014)
 Utah Tour de Donut Donut King: Donut-adjusted time of -27 minutes / 40 donuts (American Fork, Utah, September 27, 2014)

2015 
 Tour de Donut Illinois champion: Donut-adjusted time of -1 hour, 36 minutes, 40 seconds / 50 donuts (Staunton, Illinois, July 11, 2015)
 Tour de Donut Ohio ‘Double D’ champion: Donut-adjusted time of 71 minutes, 51 seconds / 44 donuts (Arcanum, Ohio, September 12, 2015)
 Donut Derby champion: Donut-adjusted time of -35 minutes, 6 seconds / 54 donuts (Breinigsville, Pennsylvania, September 7, 2015)
 Utah Tour de Donut Donut King: Donut-adjusted time of -14 minutes, 6 seconds / 36 donuts (American Fork, Utah, September 19, 2015)

2016 
 Corn on the cob world record: 47 corn / 12 minutes (West Palm Beach, Florida, April 24, 2016) at National Sweet Corn Eating Championship
 Tour de Donut Illinois champion: Donut-adjusted time of -30 minutes, 41 seconds / 39 donuts (Staunton, Illinois, July 9, 2016)
 Tour de Donut Ohio champion: Donut-adjusted time of -33 minutes, 15 seconds / 36 donuts (Arcanum, Ohio, September 10, 2016)
 Donut Derby champion: Donut-adjusted time of -9 minutes, 3 seconds / 55 donuts (Breinigsville, Pennsylvania, September 5, 2016)
 Tour de Donut Austin champion: Donut-adjusted time of -1 hour, 19 minutes / 31 donuts (Austin, Texas, November 13, 2016)

2017 
 Tour de Donut Illinois donut king: Donut-adjusted time of -8 minutes, 46 seconds / 40 donuts (Staunton, Illinois, July 8, 2017)
 Donut Derby champion: Donut-adjusted time of -31 minutes / 61 donuts (Breinigsville, Pennsylvania, September 4, 2017)
 Tour de Donut Ohio champion: Donut-adjusted time of -50 minutes, 37 seconds / 44 donuts (Troy, Ohio, September 16, 2017)
 Tour de Donut Austin champion: Donut-adjusted time of -1 hour, 45 minutes / 37 donuts (Austin, Texas, November 12, 2017)

Personal life 
Salem resides in New York City and his two cats.  His wife, Gweneviere Mann, a non-smoker, passed away on July 22, 2018 from lung cancer. She was 47.

He currently serves as Director, Group Marketing at Hearst for Esquire, Popular Mechanics, Car and Driver, and Road &Track.

Salem’s hobbies include growing and eating his own supply of organic fruits, vegetables, microgreens, and sprouts in his NYC home.

See also 
List of competitive eaters

References 

University of Texas at Austin College of Liberal Arts alumni
1981 births
Living people
People from Houston
American competitive eaters
Rutgers University alumni